Aho is an unincorporated community located in Watauga County, North Carolina, United States.  Possibly named after the Aho Branch that flows nearby, the community is located along the Blue Ridge Parkway at Bentley Knob, northeast of Blowing Rock.

References

Unincorporated communities in Watauga County, North Carolina
Unincorporated communities in North Carolina